Patrick Hayes may refer to:

Patrick Michael Hayes (1943–2011), Canadian politician, Ontario New Democratic Party
Patrick Joseph Hayes (1867–1938), Archbishop of New York (1919) & Cardinal (1924)
Pat Hayes (Patrick John Hayes, born 1944), British computer scientist
Patrick Hayes (mariner) (1770–1856), nephew of Commodore John Barry
Patrick Barry Hayes (1809–1863), American merchant

See also
Pat Hayes (disambiguation)